The 2022 FIA Motorsport Games Karting Endurance Cup is the first FIA Motorsport Games Karting Endurance Cup, held at Circuit Paul Ricard, France on 26 October to 30 October 2022. The race was contested with Tillotson T4 karts. A National driving license was necessary to be able to compete. The event was part of the 2022 FIA Motorsport Games.

Entry List

Qualifying

Main Race
Leaders:

Race Results

References

External links

GT Cup